Vivekananda Kendra Vidyalaya, known as VKV Hurda, is a boarding school in Hurda, in the state of Rajasthan, India.

It is a boarding school in Rajasthan. This school was mainly developed for children of the people working in Mayur Mills (LNJ Group), though many other local students including students from Hindustan Zinc Limited (Sterlite Group).
The school is one of the most well known in the district of Bhilwara and Ajmer, Rajasthan. It has a strength of about 900 students from all around Ajmer and Bhilwara.

Orkut connections 
VKV Hurda is a community in the Orkut, social networking website. Most of the students and teachers of the school are connected through that community site.

In addition, there is a very special and very popular group from the school, VKV Titans, who have their separate community on Orkut to discuss their private chores.

See also
Vivekananda Kendra

External links 
 VKV Hurda
 Vivekananda Kendra Vidyalayas Arunachal Pradesh Trust 

Boarding schools in Rajasthan
Vivekananda Kendra schools